Aerial may refer to:

Music 
Aerial (album), by Kate Bush
Aerials (song), from the album Toxicity by System of a Down

Bands 
Aerial (Canadian band)
Aerial (Scottish band)
Aerial (Swedish band)

Recreation and sport 
Aerial (dance move)
Aerial (skateboarding)
Front aerial, gymnastics move performed in acro dance

Technology 
Aerial (radio), a radio antenna or transducer that transmits or receives electromagnetic waves
Aerial (television), an over-the-air television reception antenna

Other uses 
Aerial, Georgia, a community in the United States
Aerial (magazine), a poetry magazine
Aerials (film), a 2016 Emirati science-fiction film
Aerial, a TV ident for BBC Two from 1997 to 2001

See also 
 Airborne (disambiguation)
 Antenna (disambiguation)